Mana Horikawa (born 4 March 1994) is a Japanese handball player for lzumi Maple Reds and the Japanese national team.

She represented Japan at the 2019 World Women's Handball Championship.

References

1994 births
Living people
Japanese female handball players
Place of birth missing (living people)
Handball players at the 2020 Summer Olympics